The 2006/07 FIS Nordic Combined World Cup was the 24th World Cup season, a combination of ski jumping and cross-country skiing organized by FIS. The season started on 25 November 2006 and lasted until 18 March 2007.

Calendar

Men

Team

Standings

Overall 

Standings after 14 events.

Sprint 

Standings after 8 events.

Nations Cup 

Standings after 16 events.

Notes

References
Official home page, from FIS

2006 in Nordic combined
2007 in Nordic combined
FIS Nordic Combined World Cup